Vincent Sherman (born Abraham Orovitz, July 16, 1906 – June 18, 2006) was an American director and actor who worked in Hollywood. His movies include Mr. Skeffington (1944), Nora Prentiss (1947), and The Young Philadelphians (1959).

He began his career as an actor on Broadway and later in film. He directed B-movies for Warner Bros. and then moved to directing to A-pictures.  He was a good friend of actor Errol Flynn, whom he directed in Adventures of Don Juan (1949). He directed three Joan Crawford movies: The Damned Don't Cry (1950), Harriet Craig (1950), and Goodbye, My Fancy (1951).

Early life
Sherman was born Abraham Orovitz to Jewish parents. He was born and raised in the small town of Vienna, Georgia, where his father was a dry-goods salesman. Not long after graduating from Oglethorpe University in Atlanta, he became a professional actor.

Career
Sherman arrived in New York City to sell a play and soon became a stage director and actor. As a stage actor, he made his Broadway debut in the ensemble of Eugene O’Neill’s Marco Millions (1928). He arrived in Hollywood during the early sound era, where he appeared in William Wyler's 1933 film Counsellor at Law starring John Barrymore. In 1938, Sherman signed on at Warner Bros. as a director. His first film as a director was the 1939 horror film The Return of Doctor X, which starred Humphrey Bogart. The 2006 release of The Return of Doctor X included a director's commentary that Sherman had recorded that year at the age of 99.

Sherman quickly built a reputation for his ability to rewrite any script he was given and turn it into the basis for a successful film. It was these skills that led him to much bigger and star-studded pictures. Sherman was initially known as a "woman's director" during the mid 1940s, but his range expanded as his career developed.

After his film career wound up, Sherman ended his career in television. In 2004, he was the oldest of 21 individuals interviewed in the documentary film Imaginary Witness, a work that chronicled 60 years of film-making about the Holocaust.

Personal life
Sherman was married to Hedda Comorau from 1931 until her death in 1984. He had two children with Comorau: a son Eric Sherman and a daughter Hedwin Naimark. He had a number of high-profile affairs during his life, including on-set affairs with Bette Davis and a three-year relationship with Joan Crawford. In his memoir Studio Affairs: My Life as a Film Director, he described his relationships with Crawford and Rita Hayworth. Until his death in 2006, he had been in a decade-long relationship with actress Francine York.

Death
Sherman died on June 18, 2006, 28 days before his 100th birthday, at the Motion Picture and Television Country House and Hospital in Woodland Hills, California.

Filmography

Director (feature film)

Actor

References

External links

 Studio Affairs: My Life as a Film Director, by Vincent Sherman, University Press of Kentucky, 1996, 344 pages

1906 births
2006 deaths
Oglethorpe University alumni
People from Vienna, Georgia
American male film actors
Film directors from Georgia (U.S. state)